Eden Hall is a historic plantation house located near McCormick in McCormick County, South Carolina.  It was built about 1854, and is a large -story, white frame Greek Revival style dwelling.  It sits on a high brick foundation and features a pedimented, two story front portico.  Also on the property is the original well and canopy.

It was listed on the National Register of Historic Places in 1980.

References

Plantation houses in South Carolina
Houses on the National Register of Historic Places in South Carolina
Greek Revival houses in South Carolina
Houses completed in 1854
Houses in McCormick County, South Carolina
National Register of Historic Places in McCormick County, South Carolina